André Armand Vingt-Trois (born 7 November 1942) is a French cardinal of the Catholic Church. He served as Archbishop of Paris from 2005 to 2017, having previously served as Archbishop of Tours from 1999 to 2005.  He was elevated to the cardinalate in 2007.

Early life and ordination
André Vingt-Trois was born in Paris, France, to Armand Vingt-Trois and Paulette (née Vuillamy). His surname, which is French for "twenty-three", is probably from an ancestor who, as a child or baby, was abandoned and found on the 23rd day of the month. Vingt-Trois completed his secondary studies at the Lycée Henri IV and entered the Seminary of Saint-Sulpice at Issy-les-Moulineaux in 1962. He then attended the Institut Catholique de Paris, from where he obtained his licentiate in moral theology. From 1964 to 1965, Vingt-Trois performed his military service in Germany. He was ordained to the diaconate by Bishop Daniel Pezeril in October 1968 and to the priesthood by Cardinal François Marty on 28 June 1969.

Pastoral work
During his priestly ministry, he worked especially in parochial catechetics and the formation of the laity. From 1974 to 1981, Vingt-Trois was vicar at the Parisian parish of Sainte-Jeanne de Chantal. He then served as director of his alma mater of the Seminary of Saint-Sulpice until 1988, also teaching moral and sacramental theology there. Vingt-Trois participated in different pastoral movements, including the Centre de préparation au mariage and the sessions of permanent formation of the clergy. He was later named vicar general of Paris, and was charged with the diocesan formation (the cathedral school and diocesan seminary), of the means of communications (Radio Notre-Dame, Paris Notre-Dame, Centre d'Information), of the familial pastoral, of the chaplains of public education, and of catechetics.

Episcopate

On 25 June 1988, Vingt-Trois was appointed Auxiliary Bishop of Paris and Titular Bishop of Thibilis by Pope John Paul II. He received his episcopal consecration on the following 14 October in Notre-Dame Cathedral from Cardinal Jean-Marie Lustiger, with Bishops Pézeril and Gabriel Vanel serving as co-consecrators. Vingt-Trois was appointed Archbishop of Tours on 21 April 1999, and Archbishop of Paris on 11 February 2005. He was installed in Paris on the following 5 March and additionally appointed Ordinary of French Catholics of the Eastern Rites on 14 March. On 5 November 2007, he was elected President of the French Episcopal Conference for a term of three years.

Cardinalate
Pope Benedict XVI created him Cardinal-Priest of S. Luigi dei Francesi in the consistory of 23 November 2007. Vingt-Trois is no longer eligible to participate in papal conclaves, having reached the age of 80 on 7 November 2022.

He has been a member of the Congregation for Bishops and the Pontifical Council for the Family since 12 June 2008 and of the Congregation for the Clergy since 2 February 2010. On 7 March 2012 he was appointed a member of the Congregation for the Oriental Churches. In October 2012, after being appointed a synod father by Pope Francis, he took part in the 13th Ordinary General Assembly of the Synod of Bishops, which concerned itself with the new evangelization for the transmission of the Christian faith.

He was one of the cardinal electors who participated in the 2013 papal conclave that selected Pope Francis. Francis accepted his resignation as Archbishop of Paris on 7 December 2017.

Opposition to same-sex marriage
The cardinal has been a vocal opponent of efforts to introduce same-sex marriage in France. In 2013, he warned that it could incite violence and split society in France: "This is the way a violent society develops. Society has lost its capacity of integration and especially its ability to blend differences in a common project." He insisted that as long as the government is not listening to French citizens, this could lead to more violence.

See also
 Catholic Church in France
 List of the Roman Catholic dioceses of France

References

1942 births
Living people
21st-century French cardinals
Archbishops of Paris
Archbishops of Tours
Auxiliary bishops of Paris
Cardinals created by Pope Benedict XVI
Institut Catholique de Paris alumni
Lycée Henri-IV alumni
Members of the Congregation for Bishops
Members of the Congregation for the Clergy
Members of the Congregation for the Oriental Churches
Members of the Order of the Holy Sepulchre
Clergy from Paris
French anti-same-sex-marriage activists